The following article gives a list of Women's association football confederations, sub-confederations and associations around the world. 

For international competitions see the article International competitions in women's football.

By continent

By country

See also

List of women's national football teams
 List of women's association football clubs

Women's association football by country
Association football-related lists
Women's association football competitions 
Association football, women's